Veliu is an Albanian surname. Notable people with the surname include:

 Franc Veliu (born 1988), Albanian footballer
 Tahir Veliu (born 1984), Albanian politician, author, and political analyst

See also
 Velius (disambiguation)

Albanian-language surnames